The 1981 Connecticut Huskies men's soccer team represented the University of Connecticut during the 1981 NCAA Division I men's soccer season. The Huskies won their first NCAA title, and second overall when including NSCAA championships.  The Huskies were coached by Joe Morrone, in his thirteenth season.  They played home games at Morrone Stadium.

Schedule

|-
!colspan=6 style="background:#002868; color:#FFFFFF;"| Regular season

|-
!colspan=6 style="background:#002868; color:#FFFFFF;"| NCAA Tournament

References

UConn Huskies men's soccer seasons
Connecticut
UConn Soccer, men's
NCAA Division I Men's Soccer Tournament-winning seasons
NCAA Division I Men's Soccer Tournament College Cup seasons
Connecticut